The Paraná gubernatorial election was held on October 3, 2010, to elect the next governor of Paraná.  The 2 people running for Governor were Beto Richa of the PSDB and Osmar Dias.  Beto Richa won election for his first term as governor.

References

2010 Brazilian gubernatorial elections
Paraná gubernatorial elections
October 2010 events in South America